Boston Open Science Laboratory (BOSLab) is a labspace in Somerville, Massachusetts, which is part of the DIYbio and biohacking movement.

Major projects
 Lightbulb PCR, which aims to build an inexpensive PCR thermal cycler using PVC tubing, an incandescent light bulb and a computer fan run with an open source microcontroller.
 BlueGene - Indigo Biosynthesis In E. Coli

Ethical concerns
The Institute of Ethics and Emerging Technologies covered the ethics of BosLab and other DIYbio groups.

References

External links

Buildings and structures in Somerville, Massachusetts
Public laboratories